Pomona Township is a township in Franklin County, Kansas, USA.  As of the 2000 census, its population was 1,174.

Geography
According to the USGS, it contains one cemetery, Woodlawn.

The streams of Hard Fish Creek and Lost Creek run through this township.

References
 USGS Geographic Names Information System (GNIS)

External links
 US-Counties.com
 City-Data.com

Townships in Franklin County, Kansas
Townships in Kansas